Omoniyi Temidayo Raphael (born 19 December 1994), known professionally as Zlatan Ibile, is a Nigerian rapper and singer. He is the chief executive officer and founder of Zanku records. In 2014, he won the Airtel-sponsored One Mic talent show held in 2014, Abeokuta, Ogun State.

Towards the end of 2018, Zlatan released a single titled "Zanku", with a new dance routine of the same name. On 3 November 2019, he released his debut studio album Zanku, an acronym for Zlatan Abeg No Kill Us. The artiste claimed in 2020 that it was his dream to become a footballer, not a musician.

Early life and career 
Omoniyi Temidayo Raphael was born and raised in Ilorin, Kwara State but has family roots in Ijurin, Ekiti State. In 2011, he graduated with a national diploma in business administration from Moshood Abiola Polytechnic. Zlatan decided to pursue a career in music after graduating secondary school. When he was 19 years old, he won the Airtel-sponsored 2014 edition of "One Mic Campus Tour" music competition, which was held in Abeokuta, Ogun State. He gained recognition in the Nigerian music industry after releasing the Olamide-assisted track "My Body" in 2017. In 2018, Lawrence Irabor, one of the co-owner of Alleluyah Boiz Entertainment sign Zlatan to their record label A.B.E. record when he heard the song Zlatan sang with Olamide.‘I Don't Regret Signing Zlatan To A.B.E Records’

Zlatan gained further exposure following his collaboration with Chinko Ekun and Lil Kesh on the 2018 hit single "Able God". Shortly afterwards, he dropped "Zanku", a song that was accompanied by a dance routine of the same name. Towards the end of 2018, Zlatan released the Davido-assisted track "Osanle". In early 2019, he released "Glory" before being featured on Burna Boy's "Killin Dem", a track from the latter's fourth studio album African Giant. Shortly afterwards, he was featured on Ceeza Milli's "Flenjo" and Naira Marley's "Am I a Yahoo Boy". On 26 July 2019, Zlatan announced he signed an endorsement deal with Coca-Cola.

Zanku Records 
On January 1, 2020, Zlatan took to his Instagram page to announce the launch of his record label 'Zanku Records' without no artists unveiled. Down to February 25, he celebrated his birthday while he announced the numbers and names of acts he signed. He listed three artists named: Papisnoop, Oberz and Jamopyper, he also announced the official signing of a Videographer/Cinematographer named Visionary Pictures, his Manager 'Manager Jiggy', his Music Producer Rexxie and a PR Consultant 'Biesloaded'. He made this announcement with a picture of him and seven other people via his Instagram page.

Arrest and release
In May 2019, the EFCC arrested Zlatan, Naira Marley and a few others in connection with an alleged case of internet fraud and money laundering. A few days later, he was released on administrative bail.

ENDSARS protest 
In October 2020, during the EndSARS protest, Zlatan released "Soro Soke" to express his concern over the massacre of innocent youths at the Lekki toll gate

Discography

Studio albums 
Zanku (2019)
Resan (2021)

Singles 
As lead artist

As featured artist

Awards and nominations

See also 
 List of Nigerian musicians

References

Living people
1994 births
21st-century Nigerian male singers
Yoruba-language singers
Moshood Abiola Polytechnic alumni
Singers from Lagos